Helga Dietrich (1940–2018) was a German orchidologist and author who is noted for her comprehensive guides to literature on orchids, and for her work as curator of the Botanischer Garten Jena.  She described over eighty species of orchids, many from Cuba.   She was a 2012 recipient of the Order of Merit of the Federal Republic of Germany.

Works

References 

1949 births
2018 deaths
German women scientists
20th-century German botanists
Orchidologists
21st-century German botanists
20th-century women scientists
Recipients of the Cross of the Order of Merit of the Federal Republic of Germany
20th-century German women
21st-century German women